Rhiannon Sarah Margaret Drake (born 13 July 1989) is a British musician, composer, producer and actress. She is best known for playing Sabrina in the original West End cast of Grim, and her role in the musical film And You Were Wonderful, On Stage.

Early life

Rhiannon was born in Watford, Hertfordshire to a Welsh mother and an English father. She attended Haberdashers' Aske's School for Girls from the age of 4 to 18, after which she attended the University of Oxford (St Peter's College). Whilst there, she was a John Bain choral scholar and a member of the award-winning a cappella group, The Oxford Gargoyles. Following a Geography degree, she went on to study acting at Arts Educational Schools, London, having been awarded the Peter Glenville Award from the University of Oxford.

Career

Early career (2012-2015)

In June 2012, Drake took a lead role in The Last Witch as Anne Thorne at The Hertford Theatre. In August of that year, she performed in a revival performance of Cole Porter's musical Aladdin at Sadler's Wells, directed by Ian Marshall-Fisher as part of his Lost Musicals project. In 2013, Rhiannon started performing internationally in Cally Spooner's performance art work And You Were Wonderful, On Stage, beginning at the Stedelijk Museum in Amsterdam. In late 2013, Rhiannon appeared as the lead role, Holly Streetter, in The Girl That Lived, a short film made in association with the mental health charity MIND. She also appeared in a number of concerts including West End Voices at Christmas and performances of Let's Do It - A Celebration of Cole Porter and his Contemporaries at Leicester Square Theatre, The Bridewell and the Jermyn Street Theatre.

At the beginning of 2014, Rhiannon was part of the revival of Dick Backard: Private Eye at The Bedford, which opened to excellent reviews; the show had a further run at Hoxton Hall. And You Were Wonderful, On Stage, returned to the UK to the Tate Britain. Soon after, Drake landed her first major West End role as Sabrina in Grim, performing first at The Rose Theatre, Kingston and then a month's run at Charing Cross Theatre; she is featured on the Original London Cast Recording. In addition, Rhiannon featured in the short film Off Camera Dialogue, written and directed by Cally Spooner. The film premiered at the BFI London Film Festival.

In 2015, Rhiannon completed further filming work on Cally Spooner's And You Were Wonderful, On Stage for exhibition at Spike Island, Bristol, before being released as a feature film in 2016. 2015 also saw many concert performances from Rhiannon, most notably Boom Bang-a-Bang at The Pheasantry, which celebrated the life and works of Ivor Novello award-winning composer Michael Julien, featuring the man himself.

Focus on producing and composing (2016-present)

In 2012, Rhiannon set up Test Of Time Productions, "with the aim of bringing both theatre and music that has stood the test of time to contemporary audiences." On 16 December 2015, Rhiannon announced via her Twitter page that in 2016 she would be relaunching this as Test Of Time Entertainment, a bespoke London-based entertainment agency and production company, signifying a shift in career focus. 

In 2018, Rhiannon finished writing her musical, The Year Without A Summer. After being workshopped in January, the musical was launched on 9 February at the Arts Theatre in London. As part of the show Herstoric, the musical had a limited run at the Drayton Arms Theatre in April 2019. The show received good reviews, with Chris Omaweng of LondonTheatre1.com writing that it followed "in the footsteps of Six and, dare I say it, Hamilton." A month later Rhiannon returned to the Drayton Arms Theatre to produce Immortality, a new musical produced by Biondi Music Theatre in association with Test of Time Entertainment.  Also in 2019, as one third of jazz trio Viva La Vamp, Rhiannon was a grand finalist at Open Mic UK, placing third. Alongside her brother Will, Rhiannon was a winner of the inaugural Ceiling Project, a platform aimed at supporting women-led writing teams in producing pieces of musical theatre focussed on women. Their short musical, Gwen, was first performed at Bishopsgate Institute in November 2019. Rhiannon was also musical director and co-composer of a revival of The Wind of Heaven by Emlyn Williams at the Finborough Theatre, London in December 2019.

Personal life

Rhiannon married in July 2016. She lives in Central London with her husband. She is related to the actress Angharad Rees on her mother's side.

Stage

Filmography

References

External links
 Rhiannon Drake's Twitter account
 Rhiannon Drake's official website
 

1989 births
Living people
English stage actresses
21st-century English actresses
Alumni of St Peter's College, Oxford